Dario de Vita (born 12 February 2000) is a German professional footballer who plays as a centre-back for Alemannia Aachen.

References

2000 births
Footballers from Cologne
Living people
German footballers
Association football central defenders
FC Viktoria Köln players
Alemannia Aachen players
3. Liga players
Regionalliga players